Sherburne High School is a historic high school located at Sherburne in Chenango County, New York. It was constructed in two phases, 1924–1925, and 1935.  The building ceased being used as a school in 1981 after consolidation in the Sherburne-Earlville Central School in 1971 and subsequent use as an intermediate school.

It was added to the National Register of Historic Places in 1988.

References

Defunct schools in New York (state)
School buildings on the National Register of Historic Places in New York (state)
Gothic Revival architecture in New York (state)
School buildings completed in 1925
Schools in Chenango County, New York
National Register of Historic Places in Chenango County, New York
1925 establishments in New York (state)